Triacanthidae, commonly known as triplespines or tripodfishes, is a family of Indo-Pacific fishes. It is classified in the order Tetraodontiformes, along with the pufferfishes and the ocean sunfish. The family consists of seven species in four genera, in addition to one extinct genus that only is known from fossils.

Much like their relatives the triggerfish and the filefish, the triplespines's first ray of the dorsal fin is formed to a spine. Further, they have two spines in place of their ventral fins. They have sharp and heavy teeth, which they use to eat hard-shelled molluscs and crustaceans.  They also have the unique ability to see ultraviolet light. Their ability to see ultraviolet light is similar to the vision of Goldfish.

Not much is known about how the fish live. They are essentially offshore fish that only come close to land occasionally.

Fossil record 
The genus Acanthopleurus is known from the species A. serratus Agassiz, 1844 and A. collettei Tyler, 1980 of the Oligocene of Glarus canton, Switzerland.  A third described species Cephalacanthus trispinosus Ciobanu, 1977 from the Oligocene of Romania, formerly in the family Dactylopteridae, has been considered to be a juvenile specimen of Acanthopleurus, though whether it belongs with one of the two described species or a new species is not yet determined.

Eye ring coloring 
Depending on the sex the colored ring around the outside of the eye is different.  This fish is identified female if the ring color is purple or yellow and male if the ring is blue or orange.  The frequency of these colors is different for each gender.

Black coral 
Where there is black coral it is likely that one will be able to spot a Triacanthidae.  They feed off of Black Coral.  This is why the Triacanthidae is mostly found around Northern Australia and Indonesia. Most fish are unable to feed off of Black Coral however their sharp and heavy teeth enable them to break the membrane of the Coral and access the rich nutrients that most fish cannot get to.  This particular species of fish has been greatly decline due to harvesting of Black Coral. The graph below shows how the number of Triacanthidae began greatly decreasing in 1990 when harvesting Black Coral for sale first gained popularity.  The species was dying rapidly until just recently in 2006 when a law banned the harvesting of Black Coral. The graph below shows then number of fish estimated for each year on the x-axis.

Numbers decline due to black coral harvesting

References

Tetraodontiformes
Marine fish families
Taxa named by Pieter Bleeker